Lyceum Theatre may refer to:

Canada 
 Royal Lyceum Theatre (Toronto), managed by Charlotte Nickinson

Spain 
 Liceu, the opera house of Barcelona

United Kingdom 
 Lyceum Theatre, London, 2,000-seat West End theatre in the City of Westminster
 Lyceum Theatre, Crewe, Edwardian period Grade II listed building and theatre
 Lyceum Theatre, Sheffield, 1,068-seat theatre in Sheffield
 Royal Lyceum Theatre, 658-seat theatre in Edinburgh
 Lyceum Theatre, Sunderland (1854–1880), 1,800-seat theatre in Tyne and Wear

United States 
 Lyceum Theatre (Broadway), a Broadway theatre at 149 West 45th Street in midtown Manhattan
 Lyceum Theatre (14th Street, Manhattan), at 107 West 14th Street in Manhattan, originally the Theatre Francais (1866)
 Lyceum Theatre (Park Avenue South), a theatre that was on Fourth Avenue (now Park Avenue South) between 23rd and 24th Streets in Manhattan
 Lyceum Theatre (San Diego), managed by the San Diego Repertory Theatre
 Lyceum Theater (Clovis, New Mexico), listed on National Register of Historic Places listings in New Mexico in Curry County

Other places 
 , in Shanghai, China

See also
Lyceum (disambiguation)